Rodoljub is a Serbian masculine given name. It may refer to:

Rodoljub Čolaković (1900–1983), communist politician
Rodoljub Marjanović (born 1988), footballer
Rodoljub Paunović (born 1985), footballer
Rodoljub "Roki" Vulovic (born 1955), singer

Slavic masculine given names
Serbian masculine given names